"Move Your Car" is a song by Swedish punk rock band Millencolin from the album Life on a Plate. It was released as a single on 26 October 1996 by Burning Heart Records, including two B-sides from the album's recording sessions, "Entrance at Rudebrook" and "An Elf and His Zippo". These two tracks were re-released, the former in 1997 on the band's next recording For Monkeys, the latter in 1999 on the compilation album The Melancholy Collection. An accompanying music video for "Move Your Car" was filmed and included in Millencolin and the Hi-8 Adventures.  A Creature from the Black Lagoon pinball game inspired the song's title and the cover art.

Track listing
"Move Your Car"
"Entrance at Rudebrook"
"An Elf and His Zippo"

Personnel

Millencolin
Nikola Sarcevic - lead vocals, bass
Erik Ohlsson - guitar
Mathias Färm - guitar
Fredrik Larzon - drums

References

Millencolin songs
1996 singles
Burning Heart Records singles
1995 songs
Songs written by Mathias Färm
Songs written by Nikola Šarčević
Songs written by Fredrik Larzon
Songs written by Erik Ohlsson (musician)